Anyang Normal University (AYNU;  "Anyang Teachers College") is a comprehensive general higher education school, now located in Anyang City, Henan Province, China.

External links
 Anyang Normal University
 Anyang Normal University 

Teachers colleges in China
Universities and colleges in Henan
1908 establishments in China
Educational institutions established in 1908